KHIP is a commercial radio station in Gonzales, California, broadcasting to the Santa Cruz-Monterey-Salinas, California area on 104.3 FM.  Its studios are in Monterey while its transmitter is located east of Salinas.

KHIP airs a classic rock music format branded as "The Hippo". It carries Las Vegas Raiders NFL games.

History
KKLF was a Spanish language station in 1995 when it simulcast KIEZ.

104.3 was home of alternative rock KMBY which moved to 103.9 in a major switch in 2002.

On July 1, 2019, Mapleton Communications announced its intent to sell its remaining 37 stations to Stephens Media Group. Stephens began operating the station that same day. The sale was consummated on September 30, 2019.

References

External links
 Official Website

HIP
Classic rock radio stations in the United States
Radio stations established in 1990
1990 establishments in California